Jan Sładkowski (born 1958 in Świętochłowice) is a Polish physicist. He is notable for his work on the role of exotic smoothness in cosmology, quantum game theory, and applications of thermodynamics in the theory of finance.

Education
He earned his PhD, under Marek Zrałek, and habilitation in theoretical physics from the University of Silesia, Katowice, Poland. He has published a number of papers on quantum field theory, mathematical physics, quantum information processing, and econophysics.

Career
He has held visiting posts at the Bielefeld University and at the University of Wisconsin–Madison. He presently holds the Chair of Astrophysics and Cosmology at the University of Silesia.

Honors
In 1999, he was a Humboldt fellow.

See also
 Quantum Aspects of Life

External links
Sładkowski at Ideas
Sładkowski at dlpb
Sładkowski at EconPapers
Sładkowski at the RePEC archive
Sładkowski's math genealogy
Sładkowski at the acm portal
Sładkowski at Scientific Commons
Sładkowski's 1999 Humboldt Fellowship

1958 births
Living people
University of Silesia in Katowice alumni
20th-century Polish physicists
Quantum physicists
Probability theorists
21st-century Polish physicists